Daniel Cosío Villegas (July 23, 1898 – March 10, 1976) was a Mexican prominent economist, essayist, historian, and diplomat.

Cosío Villegas was born in Mexico City. After studying one year in engineering and two years of philosophy, he received a B.A. in Law from the National University (nowadays UNAM) and took several courses in economics at Harvard, Wisconsin and Cornell. Later, he received master's degrees from the London School of Economics and the École libre de sciences politiques of Paris (now Institut d'études politiques de Paris).

After working briefly for Excélsior he joined José Vasconcelos in the production of La Antorcha magazine. In 1929, he served as secretary general of the National University, counselor to the Bank of Mexico, director of the National School of Economics of the National University (1933–1934), director of El Trimestre Económico and founded the Fondo de Cultura Económica, one of the most renowned publishing companies in Latin America.

On April 2, 1951 he was admitted to the National College and from 1957 until 1963 he chaired El Colegio de México, whose library now bears his name. Simultaneously, he was the Mexican Ambassador to the UN Economic and Social Council and became its president in 1959. He received the National Literature Award in 1971 and in 1976 he published Memorias (Memoirs).

Several weeks after publishing his memoirs, he died in Mexico City. Cosio Villegas was known for being a heavy smoker, even his last days.

Selected works
La cuestión arancelaria en México (The Tariff Issue in Mexico, 1932)
La historiografía política del México moderno (The Political Historiography Study of Modern Mexico, 1953)
Porfirio Díaz en la revuelta de La Noria (Porfirio Díaz in La Noria Riot, 1954)
La República restaurada. La Vida política (The Restored Republic, The Political Life, 1955)
Estados Unidos contra Porfirio Díaz (The United States against Porfirio Díaz, 1956)
La Constitución de 1857 y sus críticos (The 1857 Constitution and its critics, 1957)
El Porfiriato. Vida política exterior (Porfirio Díaz's term. Foreign Political Life, 2 volumes, 1960 and 1963)
El Porfiriato. La vida política interior (Porfirio Díaz's term. Domestic Political Life, 2 volumes, 1970 and 1973)
El sistema político mexicano (The Mexican Political System, 1972)
La sucesión presidencial (The Presidential Succession, 1975)
Historia moderna de México (Modern History of Mexico, 5 volumes out of 10, 1955 – 1974)
Memorias (Memoirs, 1976)

External links
 Daniel Cosío Villegas (El Colegio Nacional)

1898 births
1976 deaths
Members of El Colegio Nacional (Mexico)
Mexican economists
20th-century Mexican historians
National Autonomous University of Mexico alumni
Alumni of the London School of Economics
Harvard University alumni
University of Wisconsin–Madison alumni
Cornell University alumni
Permanent Delegates of Mexico to UNESCO
20th-century Mexican lawyers